South Thompson may refer to:

 South Thompson, Ohio
 South Thompson River

See also
 Kamloops-South Thompson